Jeff Rohrman is a retired U.S. soccer midfielder who spent two seasons in the American Indoor Soccer Association and one in the Western Soccer League.  He has also coached for nearly twenty years at the collegiate level.

Player
Rohrman began his collegiate career at Bethany Lutheran College where he was a junior college All American his sophomore season.  In 2008, Bethany Lutheran inducted Rohrman into the school's Athletic Hall of Fame.  He then transferred to the University of Wisconsin–Milwaukee in 1984 where he finished his final two years of college eligibility.  While at UW–Milwaukee, he was team captain, and was voted team MVP following his senior season.  Rohrman earned a bachelor’s degree in zoology from Wisconsin-Milwaukee in 1986 and his master's degree in physical education and sports administration from Minnesota State University, Mankato in 1991.

Rohrman was invited to the 1986 Olympic Soccer Festival in Houston.  In 1986 and 1987, he played for the Milwaukee Wave of the American Indoor Soccer Association and for Real Santa Barbara of the Western Soccer League in 1989.

Coach
In 1990, Rohrman began his coaching career as head coach of Bethany Lutheran College.  He then spent several seasons as an assistant women’s soccer coach at the U.S. Naval Academy.  Rohrman also worked as an intern for the U.S. Olympic Committee where he coordinated the competition for the U-20 National Team.  He was then the top assistant at the University of Maryland, College Park for seven years.

In 2002, he was hired as the head men's soccer coach at the University of Wisconsin–Madison. Wisconsin recorded the 300th win in program history under his watch,  In 2006, Wisconsin was ranked in the polls for the first time in more than 7 years, after upsetting number seven Illinois-Chicago.  In November 2008, he resigned after compiling a 61–63–12 record.

Now Coach Rohrman coaches for Bethesda Soccer Club in Maryland. His wife Nancy Rohrman, former U.S. national team member, also coaches for Bethesda.

References

External links
 University of Milwaukee-Madison

Living people
American Indoor Soccer Association players
American soccer coaches
American soccer players
Maryland Terrapins men's soccer coaches
Milwaukee Wave players
Real Santa Barbara players
Western Soccer Alliance players
Wisconsin Badgers men's soccer coaches
Milwaukee Panthers men's soccer players
Minnesota State University, Mankato alumni
Association football midfielders
1964 births